Spotlight on a Murderer is a 1961 French psychodrama/murder-mystery film directed by Georges Franju. It was released on Blu-ray and DVD by Arrow Films in August 2017 in the UK and USA regions in an open-matte 1.37:1 transfer by Gaumont of the film's original 1.66:1 aspect ratio.

Cast 
 Pierre Brasseur - Comte Hervé de Kerloguen
 Pascale Audret - Jeanne Benoist-Sainval
 Marianne Koch - Edwige
 Jean-Louis Trintignant - Jean-Marie de Kerloguen
 Dany Saval - Micheline
 Jean Babilée - Christian de Kerloguen
 Georges Rollin - Claude Benoist-Sainval
 Gérard Buhr - Henri
 Maryse Martin - Marthe
 Serge Marquand - Yvan
 Lucien Raimbourg - Julien
 Robert Vattier - Le notaire

References

External links 

1961 drama films
1961 films
French drama films
1960s French films